Chen Zhenchuan may refer to:

 Chern Jenn-chuan (陳振川), Republic of China politician
 Tan Chin Tuan (陈振传), Singaporean banker